Xinxing Subdistrict is a subdistrict inside of Heping District, Tianjin. it borders Nanyingmen Subdistrict in its north, Wudadao and Taoyuan Subdistricts in its east, Machang Subdistrict in its south, and Xuefu Subdistrict in its west. In the year 2010, its population was 60,343.

The name Xinxing is taken from Xinxing Road within the subdistrict, and it can be translates to "New Prosperity".

History

Administrative divisions 
At the end of 2021, Xinxing Subdistrict was formed from 11 communities. They are listed in the table below:

Gallery

References 

Township-level divisions of Tianjin
Heping District, Tianjin